Elections to Newport City Council were held on 10 June 2004 along with elections to the other 21 local authorities and community councils in Wales, as well as elections in the remainder of the United Kingdom. It was the first full election in Newport since it was awarded city status in 2002.

The 50 councillors elected in this election serve a four-year term.

The previous election took place in 1999.

The next full election took place in May 2008.

Background 
Newport County Borough was awarded city status in 2002, which also changed the status of the council (though the results were still reported as Newport County Borough at this election).

Following an electoral review there were a number of ward boundary changes and the number of elected councillors increased from 47 to 50, effective from the 2004 election.

Election results: overview 

|-bgcolor=#F6F6F6
| colspan=2 style="text-align: right; margin-right: 1em" | Total
| style="text-align: right;" | 50
| colspan=5 |
| style="text-align: right;" |  
| style="text-align: right;" | 
|-
|}

Ward results 
Asterixes denote sitting councillors for the ward who are standing for re-election.

Allt-yr-yn

Alway

Beechwood

Bettws

Caerleon

Cox, Macey and Macey stood for the Caerleon Independent Progressive Party at this election. Adam Cox and Naomi Macey had been elected for the Liberal Democrats at the 1999 election.

Gaer

Graig

Langstone

Liswerry

Llanwern

Malpas

Marshfield

Pillgwenlly

Ringland

Rogerstone

St Julians

Shaftesbury

Stow Hill

Tredegar Park

Victoria

Asghar became Wales' first Muslim councillor when he was elected for this ward.

References

Newport
2004